Swarna Gowri is a 1962 Indian Kannada-language film, directed by Y. R. Swamy and produced by D. R. Naidu. The film stars Rajkumar, Krishna Kumari, Udaykumar and Narasimharaju. The film has musical score by M. Venkataraju. The movie was simultaneously shot in Telugu with the same name by the same producer and director with Kanta Rao and Krishna Kumari in the lead roles.

Cast

Rajkumar as Kaalinga/Chandra
Krishna Kumari as Gowri 
Udaykumar as Maharaja
Narasimharaju as Ganapati
K. S. Ashwath as Narada
Sathyanarayana as Lord Shiva
H. R. Shastry as Shambudasa
Sandhya as Goddess Partvati
Rajasree as Malini
M. N. Lakshmi Devi as Gomathi
Ramadevi as Chandi
M. Jayashree as Maharani
Vadiraj as Giri
Ganapathi Bhat
Sorat Ashwath
Kashinath
Lakshmayya Choudhury
Jagga Rao
Sheshagiri Rao
Devaki
Praveena
Papamma in cameo appearance 
Baby Sarvamangala

Soundtrack
The music was composed by M. Venkataraju.

References

1962 films
1960s Kannada-language films
Films scored by M. Venkataraju
Films directed by Y. R. Swamy